Lonesome Traveller is a 1950 skiffle song written by Lee Hays and recorded by Pete Seeger and The Weavers in that year. The lyrics begin "I'm just a lonely and a lonesome traveller.."

Versions
 Lonnie Donegan - "Lonesome Traveller" / "Times Are Getting Hard Boys" - Metronome (1958)
 The Tarriers - "Lonesome Traveller" / "East Virginia" - London (1958)
 Charles Blackwell - "Lover And His Lass" / "Lonesome Traveller" - Triumph (1960)
 The Limeliters 1960 debut album, The Limeliters, on Elektra Records. They also did live versions on their albums The London Concert (1963), Reunion (1973), The Chicago Tapes (1976, released in 2001), Alive! In Concert (1985), Harmony (1987) and The Limeliters (Live) - An Evening With The Chad Mitchell Trio: Live At The Birchmere (1995).
 Trini Lopez - "Kansas City" / "Lonesome Traveller" Reprise (1963)
 The Au Go Go Singers (1964)
 The Seekers (1965)
 Marianne Faithfull (1965)
 Esther & Abi Ofarim recorded the song for their album Das Neue Esther & Abi Ofarim Album (1966)
 Paperboys (2009)
 Karl Denver (1962)

References

1950 songs
Trini Lopez songs
Marianne Faithfull songs
Esther & Abi Ofarim songs